Rochelle School of the Arts (RSA) is a K–8 magnet school in Lakeland, Florida that has a specific focus on art-related subjects. It offers a variety of classes, such as Art, Band, Dance, Orchestra, Theatre, and Vocal. Rochelle has many different other classes that students can participate in such as keyboard, creative writing, photography, television production, robotics, theatre tech, musical theatre, art, women's choir, men's choir, Treble Choir, Show Choir, Physical Education and handbells. There are many clubs at Rochelle that do not have a class such as, Rocketry Club, Chess Club, Junior Thespians, Ukulele, SSYRA club, National Junior Honor Society, P.E.A.R.L.S, Math Counts, Golf Club, Recycling Squad, and Robotics.

History

Before the 14th Amendment was established, Rochelle School of the Arts was a segregated black school. After the local black school was burned to the ground for the second time in the 1920s, Washington Park School was founded in 1924, and served black students up to grade 8. In 1927 it became only the sixth black high school in the state of Florida when it added 10th grade, and in 1930 Washington Park High School graduated its first class of 10 students. In 1949, the school was renamed Rochelle High School for noted black Polk County educator William A. Rochelle. William A. Rochelle migrated to Lakeland and made a mark in the field of education. In 1949, a new Rochelle High School was built three blocks away, and the old Washington Park location became Rochelle Junior High. When segregation ended, Rochelle was closed down, but later reopened then turned into an art school.

When Rochelle School of the Arts opened in 1992 as a K–8 Performing Arts school, it was the first of its kind in the State of Florida, and the second of its kind in the country.  It has been a model for the various other performing arts elementary and middle schools in the state that have followed.

The school has very diverse students and teachers. The students at Rochelle have high expectations from the teachers and staff. They were an "A" school formerly, but changed when the new principals arrived in the 2012–13 school year. They were now a "B" school. They would have been a "C" school but due to complications with the "FCAT" the grade was raised to "B" their goal was to get it back up to an "A" during the 2013–14 school year.

Rochelle School of the Arts has 8 periods a day and it works very well with their arts classes. If it were to change to blocked schedule (7 periods) the arts program would not work well. Eight periods a day gives the students a more well-rounded experience in the arts and academics. If it was a blocked schedule the students would have to stay in the class much longer and have less of a well-rounded experience in the arts because they would have only one art for each teacher. The teachers will also get to learn about what the students need to learn with an 8-period-per-day schedule.

During the 2013–14 year, Rochelle's Administration and Polk County School Board approved renovations and landscaping. They renovated many things such as the office and auditorium.

Departments at Rochelle School of the Arts

Learning academics at Rochelle is very important to their curriculum, but the arts at Rochelle are very important, too. Students can begin to major in the following programs starting in 4th grade as mini majors. During the K–3rd grades students visit each arts class to decide what their major will be. Beginning in 6th grade they can pick 2 or 3 elective classes. The teachers at Rochelle have high expectations in arts and the students' academic classes.

The Choir Department at Rochelle School of the Arts is the only middle school choir in Florida to go to ACDA Southern Division, and also sent the most middle school children to the Allstate Choir for 2013 and 2014. The Women's Choir at RSA had to pay around 8000 dollars to attend the ACDA Southern Division, and they worked very hard to earn the money. They raised the money all by themselves. Rochelle's Choir has received all superiors at District 12 Choral MPA. All of Rochelle's vocal majors received all superiors in the District 12 Solo & Ensemble. RSA's Choir has five: choirs Women's Chorus, Men's Chorus, Treble Chorus, Show Choir, and Elementary Chorus. Rochelle's Show Choir performs at various events in Polk County. Show Choir also will sometimes perform at clubhouses and sometimes Disney.

The Dance Department at Rochelle School of the Arts has teachers that are recognized throughout the world and nation. They have participated in many concerts and recitals. They are well known throughout Polk County. The Dance has 3 levels, Dance Level One, Dance Level Two, and Dance Level Three. Level One is for beginning students who learn the basics of dance, Level Two is for intermediate students, and Level Three is the top level for the most advanced students in dance. In the 2013–14 year all dance programs in Polk County had their 25th anniversary.

The Band Department at Rochelle School of the Arts is very well known for their Jazz Band which plays at many events such as the Lakeland Christmas Parade. They also have received superiors at Band MPA for District 12. Band has 4 different bands, Beginning Band, Concert Band, Symphonic Band, and Jazz Band. Band tends to read different levels of music and aims to receive superiors at Band MPA. The current band director at RSA has accomplished much in the musical and musical technique skills for the students, he also has a wide variety skills in different instruments.

The Theatre Department at Rochelle School of the Arts has hosted the Junior Thespians District Conference, and regularly competes at the Florida State Junior Thespians Festival, earning superior ratings. Middle School Theatre offers two levels for their majors: Beginning Theatre and Advanced Theatre.  Middle School Theatre Majors focus their study on Scene and Monologue Work, Theatre History, Movement Training, Technical Theatre, and Vocal Production.  In addition, they build the sets and serve as stage crew members for the various performances in their 370-seat theatre.  There is also an elementary theatre program for students in Kindergarten through Fifth Grade who are interested in exploring theatre and becoming theatre majors in middle school. The theatre department also offers two elective classes: Musical Theatre, and Technical Theatre.  These elective classes are open to any middle school student.  Students involved in the department perform in various projects throughout the year, including their fall play and spring musical. Many students stay active by participating in the various Community Theatres in the area.

The Orchestra Department at Rochelle School of the Arts has received straight superiors at Orchestra Music Performance Assessment (MPA). Their most popular group is Swinging Strings. Orchestra has 3 levels, Amati Orchestra, Stradavari Orchestra, and Swinging Strings. Swinging Strings performs at various festivals and events in Lakeland and Polk County. They perform advanced music and strive for the best performance they can possibly do. They work very hard and practice during their designated class periods. They usually perform Winter and Spring concerts every year.

The Art Department has had many students attend art festivals in the Lakeland area. They have won awards for the fine paintings and drawings. Students at Rochelle tend to receive "Best In Show" awards at art contests. Art has many programs such as tech theatre, digital art, 2d, 3d, and more.
 The Art program also allows Elementary students to major in the art program. The elementary students at Rochelle attend many art shows, art contests, and talent shows around and in the Lakeland, Florida area. Most of the elementary art students continue to major in art in middle school.

Extras and electives at Rochelle School of the Arts

The National Junior Honor Society (NJHS) at Rochelle School of the Arts has participated in many of the fundraisers and raised about $12,000 towards many of these fundraisers. They also sent many items to the "Operation Christmas Child" to help relieve children in underprivileged countries.

The 2013–14 Robotics Team at Rochelle School of the Arts attended the Robotics Conference in Toronto, Canada.

In the 2013–14 year the Girls Basketball team went undefeated.

Every year at Rochelle 8th grade has an "Eighth Grade Talent" show which is open to parents and students.

Notable people
Clarence Childs, professional football player
Joe Sweet, professional football player

References

External links
 School website
 

Art schools in Florida
Buildings and structures in Lakeland, Florida
Educational institutions established in 1954
1954 establishments in Florida
Schools in Polk County, Florida